Mariah Williams (born 31 May 1995) is an Australian field hockey player. She represented her country at the 2016 Summer Olympics.

Personal life
Williams was born and raised in Parkes, New South Wales.

She plays national representative hockey for her home state. She also featured as the a headline player for New South Wales in the launch of their new premier team, NSW Pride, which will compete in the inaugural Hockey One league in 2019.

In 2017, Williams was honoured by her home town council after a new synthetic hockey pitch was named after her.

Career

Junior national team
Williams first played for the 'Jillaroos' team in 2013, at the Australian Youth Olympic Festival in January. Williams again represented the team at the Junior Oceania Cup in February, which qualified the team for the 2013 Junior World Cup.

Williams made her last appearance for the Jillaroos in 2016, where she captained the team to a bronze medal at the Junior World Cup.

Senior national team
Williams made her senior international debut in April 2013, in a test series against Korea in Perth, Western Australia.

In 2017, Williams was forced to miss numerous competitions due to ongoing injury to her adductor. The injury ultimately ruled her out for almost two years.

Williams made her return to the senior national team in February 2019, in the inaugural tournament of the FIH Pro League, where Australia finished second.

Following her return to international hockey in the FIH Pro League, Williams was named in the Oceania Cup squad. At the tournament Williams scored one goal, and Australia finished in second place.

Williams qualified for the Tokyo 2020 Olympics. She was part of the Hockeyroos Olympics squad. The Hockeyroos lost 1-0 to India in the quarterfinals and therefore were not in medal contention.

International goals

References

External links
 
 
 

1995 births
Living people
Australian female field hockey players
Field hockey players at the 2016 Summer Olympics
Olympic field hockey players of Australia
Place of birth missing (living people)
Field hockey players at the 2020 Summer Olympics
Field hockey players at the 2022 Commonwealth Games
People from the Central West (New South Wales)
Sportswomen from New South Wales
20th-century Australian women
21st-century Australian women
Commonwealth Games silver medallists for Australia
Commonwealth Games medallists in field hockey
Medallists at the 2022 Commonwealth Games